Anagraphis is a genus of ground spiders that was first described by Eugène Simon in 1893. Originally placed in the now unrecognized family Prodidomidae, it was moved to the family Gnaphosidae in 2006.

Species
 it contains seven species from Asia and Africa:
Anagraphis incerta Caporiacco, 1941 – Ethiopia
Anagraphis maculosa Denis, 1958 – Afghanistan
Anagraphis minima Caporiacco, 1947 – East Africa
Anagraphis ochracea (L. Koch, 1867) – Albania, Macedonia, Greece, Turkey
Anagraphis pallens Simon, 1893 (type) – Libya, Malta, Greece, Turkey, Israel, Syria, Russia (Europe), Azerbaijan, Iran, Kazakhstan, Central Asia
Anagraphis pluridentata Simon, 1897 – Syria
Anagraphis pori Levy, 1999 – Israel

References

Araneomorphae genera
Gnaphosidae
Spiders of Africa
Spiders of Asia
Taxa named by Eugène Simon